Azenia is a genus of moths of the family Noctuidae.

Species
 Azenia edentata (Grote, 1883)
 Azenia implora Grote, 1883
 Azenia obtusa (Herrich-Schäffer, 1854)
 Azenia perflava (Harvey, 1875)
 Azenia procida (Druce, 1889) (=Azenia nepotica (Dyar, 1912))
 Azenia templetonae Clarke, 1937
 Azenia virida (Barnes & McDunnough, 1916)

References
 Azenia at Markku Savela's Lepidoptera and Some Other Life Forms
 Natural History Museum Lepidoptera genus database

Acronictinae